Lady of the Pavements (UK title: Lady of the Night) is a 1929 American silent romantic drama film directed by D. W. Griffith and starring Lupe Vélez, William Boyd, and Jetta Goudal. The screenplay was written by Sam Taylor, with contributions from an uncredited Gerrit Lloyd. Griffith reshot the film to include a few musical sequences, making it a part-talkie.

Plot
Disgusted that his fiancée, Diane (Jetta Goudal) has been cheating on him, Karl (William Boyd) says he'd rather marry a "street walker" than her. To get back at him, Diane arranges for Nanoni ("Little One") (Lupe Vélez), a singer at a sleazy bar, to pretend to be a Spanish girl, from a convent, to fool him.

Cast
 Lupe Vélez as Nanon del Rayon
 William Boyd as Count Karl Von Arnim
 Jetta Goudal as Countess Diane des Granges
 Albert Conti as Baron Finot
 George Fawcett as Baron Haussmann
 Henry Armetta as Papa Pierre
 William Bakewell as A Pianist
 Franklin Pangborn as M'sieu Dubrey, Dance Master

Preservation
The Vitaphone sound-on-disc system was employed for sound sequences. Discs 6 and 8 are in the UCLA Film and Television Archive. Other sound discs to this film were donated by Arthur Lennig to the George Eastman House Motion Picture Collection in Rochester, New York.

References

External links

 
 
 
 
 Lady of the Pavements poster
 Stills at moviessilently.com
 Still at silentfilm.org
 Lady of the Pavements on YouTube

1929 films
American silent feature films
Films directed by D. W. Griffith
United Artists films
Transitional sound films
1929 romantic drama films
American romantic drama films
Films produced by Joseph M. Schenck
Films with screenplays by Sam Taylor (director)
American black-and-white films
Films set in France
Films set in the 19th century
1920s American films
Silent romantic drama films
Silent American drama films